The Donald J. Trump Foundation was a New York-based charitable foundation founded by Donald Trump. The following is a partial list of grants made by the foundation from 2006 through 2009.

Partial List of grants reported by the Foundation Center 
The foundation's annual IRS Form 990 filing would normally contain the full list of grants made by the foundation.  The following lists are incomplete.

The following were reported to the Foundation Center during the year 2006:

United Way of New York City — $250,000
Operation Smile — $117,000
Dana Farber Cancer Institute — $60,000
Police Athletic League of New York — $60,000
Intrepid Museum Foundation — $50,000
Visiting Nurse and Hospice Care — $25,000
Metropolitan Museum of Art — $15,000

The following grants were reported to the Foundation Center during the year 2007:

Police Athletic League of New York — $110,000
Fisher House Foundation of Maryland — $100,000
New York-Presbyterian Hospital — $100,000
Metropolitan Golf Association Foundation — $50,000
Dana Farber Cancer Institute — $25,000
Disabled Veterans LIFE Memorial Foundation of Florida — $25,000
Joe Torre Safe at Home Foundation of New York — $25,000
New York City Police Foundation — $25,000
Palm Beach Police Department of Florida — $25,000

The Palm Beach Post has listed some additional recipients, as "a few of the larger donations made by the foundation through the years":

Billy Graham Evangelistic Association and Samaritan’s Purse — $135,000 
Leukemia and Lymphoma Society — $50,000
Drumthwacket Foundation — $40,000
Citizens United Foundation — $100,000

According to a review by the International Business Times, the Trump Foundation did not give to right-wing causes until 2010, when donations to conservative organizations were first reported. Among these organizations, the Foundation gave:

Liberty Central Inc. — $10,000 in 2010
Citizens Against Government Waste — $10,000 in 2010
Billy Graham Evangelistic Association — $50,000 in 2012
American Conservative Union — $50,00 in 2013
Family Leader Foundation — $20,000 in 2013 and 2014
Citizens United Foundation — $100,000 in 2014

In 2010, the Trump Foundation made a $10,000 contribution to Jenny McCarthy's Generation Rescue, an organization that promotes vaccine hesitancy.

References

Business career of Donald Trump
Grants (money)
Grants